The following is a list of notable Filipinos who have acquired Philippine citizenship through naturalization. In contrast, natural-born Filipinos, are individuals who have one or both parents who were Philippine citizens at the time of the birth of that individual.

List
The following is a list of people who acquired Filipino citizenship through naturalization.

See also
Philippine nationality law

References